Christ Church Cathedral  is the Anglican cathedral of the Diocese of Yukon in Whitehorse, Yukon.

References
 

Anglican cathedrals in Canada
Buildings and structures in Whitehorse
Churches in Yukon